Jay F. W. Pearson (May 7, 1901 – August 8, 1965) was a marine biologist and university administrator, serving as both President and Chancellor of the University of Miami.

Biography
Pearson served as president of the University of Miami from 1953 to 1962 and was a charter faculty member of the university. He was recruited from the University of Pittsburgh and succeeded Bowman Foster Ashe as University of Miami president.  Pearson ushered in a decade of growth for the University of Miami. During his presidency, UM awarded its first doctorate degrees and ended racial segregation. Enrollment increased by more than 4,000 during his tenure. He spearheaded the university's desegregation and over 70 African-American students enrolled for the first time. Pearson was named Chancellor after retiring as President.

Works or publications

References

1901 births
1965 deaths
Presidents of the University of Miami
University of Pittsburgh faculty
University of Pittsburgh alumni
University of Chicago alumni
20th-century American academics